Vasiliko (before 1928: Τσαραπλανά - Tsaraplana) is a village in the municipality of Pogoni, Ioannina regional unit, Epirus, Greece. It is situated at an altitude of 800 m. It is 3 km east of Kefalovryso, 13 km west of Konitsa, 16 km south of Leskovik (Albania) and 44 km northwest of Ioannina.

Population

People
Vasiliko is home to an Aromanian community. Vasiliko is the place of birth of the Patriarch of Constantinople Athenagoras I (1948–1972), who was born there on 25 March 1886 as Aristoklis Spyrou.

See also

List of settlements in the Ioannina regional unit

External links
Vassiliko at the GTP Travel Pages

References

Populated places in Ioannina (regional unit)